Andrew "Roo" Panes (born 8 June 1988) is an English folk singer-songwriter and model. He has released three EPs: Once (2012), Weight of Your World (2012), and Land of the Living (2013). His début LP Little Giant was released in Autumn 2014, with the leading single "Tiger Striped Sky" previously released on 23 June 2014. His follow-up album Paperweights came in 2016. His third album Quiet Man arrived in 2018, with a deluxe edition released in the following year. Panes plays a 12-string acoustic guitar.  Introspective lyrics and a band of string-players contribute to a genre of classical folk music.

Panes gained a wide audience in 2012 after participating in a campaign for Burberry as he joined actress Gabriella Wilde as Burberry label's new campaign star. The contract also included recording music for Burberry Acoustic and modelling.

Background
Panes comes from a musical background, his grandmother was a classical pianist and his mother studied performing arts at Guildhall School of Music and Drama and then worked in theatre. His twin sister is a photographer and his older sister is an illustrator that has developed and designed the artwork for all of his albums.

In 2014 his song “Know Me Well” from the Little Giant album (2014) was used over the end credits of the Christmas special of the BBC comedy series Cuckoo (the final episode of Series 2).

Panes received the nickname 'Roo' after falling into a river as a child. It was also a homage to a Winnie-the-Pooh character who met a similar fate while playing a game called Poohsticks.

Studio albums

EP

Singles

Videography
2011: "I'll Move Mountains"
2012: "Silver Moon"
2012: "Know Me Well"
2013: "Open Road"
2013: "Home From Home"
2014: "Tiger Striped Sky"
2016: "Where I Want To Go"
2016: "Stay With Me"
2016: "Lullaby Love"
2017: "A Message to Myself"
2018: "My Sweet Refuge"
2018: "Sketches of Summer"
2018: "Ophelia"
2019: "Warrior"
2021: "I Just Love You"

References

External links
Official website

1988 births
Living people
English male singer-songwriters
English folk singers
English people of Scottish descent
English male models
21st-century English singers
Musicians from Dorset
21st-century British male singers